Antoine Maurice Thompson (born March 1, 1970) is an American politician from Buffalo, New York. A Democrat, Thompson represented the 60th District in the New York State Senate from 2007 to 2011. Thompson previously served as the Masten District councilman on the Buffalo Common Council from 2001 to 2007.

Personal
Born in Buffalo, New York, Thompson is a 1994 graduate of State University of New York at Brockport where he received a Bachelor of Science in history.  He was raised in Buffalo and was a graduate of public schools #60, #61 and Bennett High School.

He is the son of Richard Allen Thompson and Wanda Strong Thompson, Antoine is married to Tracey Thompson and the father of Deja LaShay and Joseph Antoine Alexander Thompson.  In high school, he served as captain of both the cross-country and track & field teams and earned All-Western New York Honors in both. Thompson is a member of Alpha Phi Alpha.

Early career
Starting in 1996, he served two years as a legislative assistant to the Buffalo Common Council.  In early 1998, he was named executive director of the Office of Urban Initiatives, which is a community development corporation that endeavors to improve business opportunities for minorities. After then-Common Councilman Byron Brown was elected to the New York State Senate in November 2000, Thompson was favored for an appointment as Brown's successor.

Buffalo Common Councilmember
Thompson was sworn in as the Masten District Common Councilman on January 4, 2001 after being appointed by the Democratic Committee. His East Side district included 27% of Buffalo's African American population. The Buffalo Common Council had a brief African-American majority during Thompson's appointed half term that ended following the subsequent elections in September and November 2001. After African-Americans lost their majority the council voted along racial lines by a 7–6 margin to shrink the common council from thirteen to nine members by eliminating the four at-large positions (three of which were held by African-Americans). The city voters endorsed the proposal by a 35,849–19,036 margin which largely went along racial lines. Thompson retained his council position in the 2001, 2003 and 2005 elections. Thompson served as a John Edwards delegate at the 2004 Democratic National Convention.

As a councilmember, Thompson advocated against crime and economic malaise and for foster economic development, worker training, and public parks. He also co-sponsored a resolution with David Franczyk against continued military involvement in the Iraq War.

Potential bids for higher office
In 2005, Thompson began testing the waters for higher office. He raised campaign funds and consulted party leaders about the possibility of challenging United States House of Representatives then 76-year-old congresswoman Louise Slaughter who was already a 10-term veteran. Slaughter's New York's 28th congressional district was 29 percent African American, and minorities comprised nearly 40 percent of the Democratic primary vote. Charles B. Rangel warned that Slaughter had strong ties to the Congressional Black Caucus as well as strong support from labor, women's and pro-choice groups.

Thompson was encouraged to pursue Brown's New York State Senate seat that was to be filled by special election on February 28, 2006 after Brown ascended to be the Mayor of Buffalo on January 1, 2006 following the 2005 election.  The district has a 4–1 ratio of registered Democrats to Republicans. In 2006, the Erie County Democratic Party chairman was Leonard Lenihan, and he noted that Thompson had not been timely in entering the special election process. The Erie and Niagara County Democratic committees bypassed Thompson as their nominee in favor of Marc Coppola despite Brown's backing. Thompson had issued a threat that without backing for the State Senate seat, he would challenge Slaughter in the September primary election, but Lenihan was unimpressed with the threat and asserted that Thompson needed to take a "Dale Carnegie course in terms of how to win friends and influence people".

Thompson decided to run for the New York Senate seat in the November 2006 general election. Marc Coppola won the special election by a 56–44% margin in a district where Democrats outnumber Republicans more than 6:1.  Thompson opposed incumbent Senator Marc Coppola as well as his cousin Former State Sen. Al Coppola in the September 2006 Democratic Primary for a full two-year term in the Senate. Thompson defeated both with 53% of the vote. He then defeated Marc Coppola again in the General election where Coppola ran as an Independent.

New York State Senator

When Thompson became a State Senator in January 2007, he—along with Diane Savino and Jeffrey Klein (both of whom later defected from the Senate Democratic Conference to form the core of the Independent Democratic Conference)--assumed the chairmanship of the New York Democratic Senate Campaign Committee. He retained this position through the 2008 general election.

Thompson was the Chairman of the Senate Environmental Conservation Committee. He was the former Ranking Minority Member of the Senate Cities Committee, which oversaw all legislation impacting the state's 62 incorporated cities and urban policy. This position was held by his two immediate predecessors in the Senate, Byron Brown and Marc Coppola. Thompson served on the Finance; Commerce, Economic Development and Small Business; Tourism, Recreation and Sports Development and Veterans, Homeland Security and Military Affairs committees.

When Thompson assumed office, he worked on economic revitalization issues and the redevelopment of brownfield land, but he had to combat government inaction and bureaucracy in this effort. In 2010, Thompson arranged for a $400,000 grant from the State's Economic Development Program for Manhattan billionaire Howard Milstein's Niagara Falls Redevelopment company to demolish properties in Niagara Falls, New York. Thompson was a vocal spokesman against the May 2007 bill to raise State Senator salaries because the lack of raises for Buffalo city workers made it seem wrong to him.  After refusing to comment on the issue for some time, Thompson was one of eight Democratic defectors on Eliot Spitzer's unpopular policy allowing illegal aliens to obtain driver's licenses.  Thompson was one of eleven New York State Senators to be uncontested in the November 2008 general election.  He supported the streamlining of minority- and woman-owned business certification and opposed fracking Thompson voted in favor of same-sex marriage legislation on December 2, 2009, but the bill was defeated.

Thompson won the Democratic Party nomination in a three-way contest in the September 14, 2010 primary election. After a lengthy recount Thompson lost the general election to Mark Grisanti, an enrolled Democrat who ran on the Republican Party line.  Days before the election, Thompson was named in a pay to play scandal where he received $8600 from Aqueduct Entertainment Group (AEG), who was attempting to secure a lucrative state contract to operate a video slot machine casino at Aqueduct Racetrack in Queens, New York.

Other
As of 2018, Thompson served as the Executive Director of the National Association of Real Estate Brokers (NAREB), the largest organization of African-American real estate professionals in the United States.

Thompson formerly hosted Western New York on the Move, a weekly radio show broadcast Thursdays at noon on WUFO 1080 AM.

See also
 2009 New York State Senate leadership crisis

References

External links
New York State Senate: Antoine M. Thompson "This Senator is currently inactive, and this content is provided to you as an archive."

1970 births
African-American state legislators in New York (state)
Living people
Democratic Party New York (state) state senators
Buffalo Common Council members
State University of New York at Brockport alumni
2004 United States presidential electors
21st-century American politicians
Baptists from New York (state)
African-American city council members in New York (state)
21st-century African-American politicians
20th-century African-American people